Grace Episcopal Church is a historic Episcopal church building at Common and Jackson Streets in Lawrence, Massachusetts.  The site on which it as built has been used for religious facilities since 1846, around the time of Lawrence's founding.  This simple Gothic Revival stone structure was built in 1852, replacing an earlier wooden chapel, and was enlarged in 1892.  The church is also notable for its association with the Lawrence family: William Lawrence, grandson of founder Abbott Lawrence, became its minister in 1876.

The church was listed on the National Register of Historic Places in 1976.

See also
National Register of Historic Places listings in Lawrence, Massachusetts
National Register of Historic Places listings in Essex County, Massachusetts

References

External links
Diocese of Massachusetts page on the church

Churches completed in 1851
19th-century Episcopal church buildings
Episcopal church buildings in Massachusetts
Churches on the National Register of Historic Places in Massachusetts
Buildings and structures in Lawrence, Massachusetts
Churches in Essex County, Massachusetts
National Register of Historic Places in Lawrence, Massachusetts
1846 establishments in Massachusetts